Alive at the Village Vanguard is a collaborative live album by pianist Fred Hersch and jazz bassist Esperanza Spalding. Palmetto Records released the album on 6 January 2023.

Background
The album marks Hersch's sixth release recorded in the storied venue. He explained, "This recording sounds like you’re in the best seat in the Vanguard for a very live experience. You can really feel the vitality of the room, of the audience, and of our interplay. We decided on the word Alive for the album title as you can really feel the intimacy and energy of the performances." Spalding does not play a bass here, performing vocal parts only.

Reception
Matt Collar of AllMusic wrote, "Alive at the Village Vanguard captures pianist Fred Hersch and vocalist Esperanza Spalding in an intimate yet inventively expressive duo performance. On first glance, the combination of Hersch (a veteran performer known for his lyrical standards work) and Spalding (a virtuoso bassist and singer known for her highly conceptual, genre-bending albums) may seem like an odd pairing." A reviewer of Jazz Trail commented, "Without major arrangements, this piano-voice duo recording captured live at New York's Village Vanguard, shows off the many musical qualities of Fred Hersch and Esperanza Spalding. The pair imbues most of the tunes with a quirky perspective and humor, but I felt this work more as an audience entertainment rather than an audio recording to be revisited."

Track listing

Personnel
Band
Fred Hersch – piano, producing
Esperanza Spalding – voices, producing

Production
Douglas Heusser – design
Erika Kapin – photography
Missi Callazzo – executive producer
Geoff Countryman – assistant engineer
James Farber – engineer
Tyler McDiarmid – assistant engineer, mixing
Nate Wood – mastering

References

Palmetto Records live albums
2023 live albums
Esperanza Spalding live albums
Collaborative albums
Fred Hersch live albums